Jan Joachim Borren (born 27 September 1947 in Eindhoven) is a former field hockey player from New Zealand, who was a member of the national teams competing at the 1968 Summer Olympics in Montreal and the 1972 Summer Olympics in Munich.

References

External links
 

1947 births
Living people
Dutch emigrants to New Zealand
Field hockey players at the 1968 Summer Olympics
Field hockey players at the 1972 Summer Olympics
New Zealand field hockey coaches
New Zealand male field hockey players
Olympic field hockey players of New Zealand
Sportspeople from Eindhoven
New Zealand Olympic coaches
New Zealand women's national field hockey team coaches